Surf Beach may refer to:

 Surf Beach, California or Surf, California
 Surf Beach, New South Wales
 Surf Beach, Victoria

See also
Beach
Beach (disambiguation)
Surfing
Surfing (disambiguation)